Jerry Allen Coyne (born December 30, 1949) is an American biologist and skeptic known for his work on speciation and his commentary on intelligent design.  A professor emeritus at the University of Chicago in the Department of Ecology and Evolution, he has published numerous papers on the theory of evolution. His concentration is speciation and ecological and evolutionary genetics, particularly as they involve the fruit fly, Drosophila.

He is the author of the text Speciation and the bestselling non-fiction book Why Evolution Is True.  Coyne maintains a website and writes for his blog, also called Why Evolution Is True. He is a hard determinist.

Coyne gained attention outside of the scientific community as a public critic of religion. As a proponent of New Atheism, he is often cited with atheists such as Richard Dawkins and Sam Harris. He is the author of the book Faith Versus Fact.

Early life and education 
Jerry Allen Coyne was born December 30, 1949. He was raised by Jewish parents. He graduated with a B.S. in biology from the College of William & Mary in 1971. According to Coyne, while in college, he was involved in activism against apartheid and protested against the Vietnam War. His graduate work at Rockefeller University under Theodosius Dobzhansky was interrupted when he was drafted.  He earned a Ph.D. in biology at Harvard University in 1978, studying under Richard Lewontin, and went on to do a postdoctoral fellowship at the University of California, Davis with Timothy Prout.

Career 
Coyne was awarded a Guggenheim Fellowship in 1988. He was elected to the American Academy of Arts and Sciences in 2007. He received the Emperor Has No Clothes Award from the Freedom from Religion Foundation in 2011.

Coyne has served as Vice President (1996) and President (2011) of the Society for the Study of Evolution. He has been associate editor of the publications Evolution (1985–1988; 1994–2000) and The American Naturalist (1990–1993). He has taught evolutionary biology, speciation, genetic analysis, social issues and scientific knowledge, scientific speaking and writing. He considers evolutionary biology to be "... more like the fine arts of science, in that it's aesthetically quite satisfying, but it also happens to be true, which is an extra bonus."

His writing has been published in the scientific journals Nature, and Science, as well as new and magazine publications including The New York Times, the Times Literary Supplement, and The New Republic. His research interests include population and evolutionary genetics, speciation, ecological and quantitative genetics, chromosome evolution, and sperm competition.

Coyne is a critic of creationism, theistic evolution, and intelligent design, which he calls "the latest pseudoscientific incarnation of religious creationism, cleverly crafted by a new group of enthusiasts to circumvent recent legal restrictions."

In a 1996 critique of the theory of intelligent-design creationism, Coyne wrote a New Republic article on Of Pandas and People (a book review), which started a long history of writing on evolution and creationism.

Coyne lists the following evidence for evolution, as detailed in his book and elsewhere:
 Fossil record
 Embryology
 Molecular biology
 Presence of vestigial organs
 Biogeography
 Sequence similarity between species that are also observed as a time-dependent change in junk DNA

Transitional fossils provide rich evidence for evolution. Charles Darwin predicted such fossils in 1859, and those later identified as such include:
 Tiktaalik (transition between fish and amphibians)
 Ichthyostega (transition between amphibians and reptiles)
 Mammal-like reptiles (not classified one or the other)
 Archaeopteryx (transition between reptiles and birds)
 Ambulocetus (transition between land mammals and whales)
 Early human fossils with ape-like skulls
 Series of terrestrial fossils between land animals and whales
The evidence includes transitional fossils and occurrences in the fossil record at times between their putative ancestors and their more modern relatives.

The Ecuadoran frog Atelopus coynei is named after Coyne who collected the holotype in a swamp on a frogging trip to western Ecuador as a student in the late 1970s.

Atheism and skepticism

Coyne considers himself a secular Jew, and an outspoken anti-theist. As a proponent of New Atheism, he is often cited with atheists such as Richard Dawkins and Sam Harris. He supports the theses of metaphysical naturalism and the conflict thesis. He claims that religion and science are fundamentally incompatible, that only rational evaluation of evidence is capable of reliably discovering the world and the way it works, and that scientists who hold religious views are only reflective of the idea, "that people can hold two conflicting notions in their heads at the same time" (cognitive dissonance). He has argued that the incompatibility of science and faith is based on irreconcilable differences in methodology, philosophy, and outcomes when they try to discern truths about the universe.

Coyne produces a website in blog format titled Why Evolution Is True. As of January 10, 2023, it had over 73,000 subscribers. On the blog, he has covered subjects spanning science, medical ethics, atheism, determinism, philosophy and free speech. 

Coyne is an advocate of skepticism, and has stated that "all scientific progress requires a climate of strong skepticism." He has participated in public forums and debates with theists.

Coyne offers criticism of creationists who appear closed minded by adhering to a literal Biblical view. He questions the creationist concept of animals diverging only within kinds, which is in itself an admission of transitional intermediates between very different groups (i.e., whales and their terrestrial relatives) found throughout the fossil record. In a New Republic article, Coyne wrote that "we have many examples of transitional fossils between what anyone would consider different kinds: fish and amphibians (like Tiktaalik, which Nye mentioned), between amphibians and reptiles, between reptiles and mammals, between reptiles and birds, between land animals and whales, and of course, between early and modern humans, with early fossils showing intermediacy between the features of apelike ancestors and modern humans." Coyne believes that both sides of such debates between evolutionists and young earth creationists could benefit from a better understanding of the fossil record and for modern tools such as Isochron dating. He considers that the inability of creationists to address these subjects fully suggests that "religion can poison one's mind so deeply that it becomes immunized to the real truth about the cosmos."

He has stated that he believes in free speech for all and does not like seeing universities cancel speakers, such as Steve Bannon, because of protests, saying "I can't think of a single person I would urge the University to disinvite. Not a single person – not a white racist, not an anti-immigration person. Free speech has to defend the most odious people."

Determinism
Coyne is a hard determinist. He came to believe in the idea of determinism after reading a paper by Anthony Cashmore on determinism and the criminal justice system. He states that recognising there is no free will makes one more empathetic and less judgmental: "A lot of politics—particularly Republican politics—is based on the supposition that people are responsible for their own lives. So, for example, people who are on welfare, or homeless people, are treated as if they could have done otherwise. They could have gotten a job, they could have gotten married and had a father for their kids. But they couldn't, because they're victims of circumstance."

Personal life
According to an article in The Chicago Maroon, Coyne retired in 2015 and continues to pursue publishing and work in his lab at the university. He considers himself to be a traditional liberal while also strongly supporting free speech.

During the COVID-19 pandemic, Coyne requested permission to access the University of Chicago's Botany Pond to feed a female duck and her ducklings in the event of a campus lockdown; he had named the mother Honey, and fed the group until they migrated. The university granted his request. Honey has returned for several years to the pond, and Coyne has persisted with feeding the ducks breeding there.

Bibliography

References

External links

 Why Evolution is True
 'Why Evolution Is True' by Jerry Coyne, April 14, 2012, video at ExChristian.net, 57 minutes.
 Video Lecture Why Evolution is True and Why Many People Still Don't Believe It at Harvard University Museum of Natural History (Hosted by Vimeo), May 2, 2012, page includes lectures by Jack W. Szostak, Iain Couzin, and Randolph Nesse, 75 minutes.
 Q&A with Jerry Coyne (along with Mohamed Noor) Sep 11, 2012 on YouTube, 30 minutes. 
 (interview by Joel Guttormson, Outreach and Event Coordinator for the Richard Dawkins Foundation for Reason and Science) Dec 16, 2013, 8 minutes. 
 (interview by Joel Guttormson, Outreach and Event Coordinator for the Richard Dawkins Foundation for Reason and Science) Dec 16, 2013, 4 minutes. 
 (interview by Joel Guttormson, Outreach and Event Coordinator for the Richard Dawkins Foundation for Reason and Science) Dec 16, 2013, 7 minutes. 
 Podcast with Sam Harris

1949 births
Living people
American geneticists
American atheism activists
Christ myth theory proponents
Critics of creationism
Critics of Lamarckism
Critics of parapsychology
Determinists
New Atheism
University of Chicago faculty
Intelligent design controversies
College of William & Mary alumni
Harvard Graduate School of Arts and Sciences alumni
Science bloggers
20th-century American Jews
Jewish American atheists
20th-century atheists
21st-century atheists
21st-century American Jews